Bernetz may refer to:

Places 
Bernetz River, a river in Eeyou Istchee Baie-James, Quebec, Canada
Lake Bernetz, a lake in the unorganized territory of Lac-Despinassy in Abitibi-Témiscamingue
Lake Bernetz, a lake in the municipality of Lac-Bouchette in Saguenay-Lac-Saint-Jean

People with the name 
 Christian Berentz (1658–1722), also known as Cristiano Bernetz, German Baroque painter

See also 
 Battle of Bernetz Brook, a battle fought in 1758 between Britain and France